Kershope Foot railway station served the hamlet of Kershopefoot, Cumbria, from 1862 to 1969 on the Border Union Railway.

History 
The station opened on 1 March 1862 by the Border Union Railway. It was situated on the south side of an unnamed minor road. The station was originally called Kershope but it was later called Kershope Foot. The station sign spelled it as a single word. The goods yard was composed of two sidings, one of them running a short distance behind the down platform. The goods yard closed on 28 December 1964. On 27 March 1967 the station was downgraded to an unstaffed halt, although the suffix 'halt' never appeared on any tickets or signs or in any timetables. The station was closed to both passengers and goods traffic on 6 January 1969.

References

External links 

Disused railway stations in Cumbria
Railway stations in Great Britain opened in 1862
Railway stations in Great Britain closed in 1969
Beeching closures in England
Former North British Railway stations
1862 establishments in England
1969 disestablishments in Scotland